Zakeer Mundampara is an Indian footballer who last played as a midfielder for Indian Super League club Kerala Blasters FC.

Early life
Zakeer started taking football seriously at the age of 15. He played for Spandanam, Areekode and Areekode Town Team during his early days as a footballer. He then joined Orient High School for studies where he continued playing football. From there he went to Moorkanad Higher Secondary School and then to MES College, Mampad.

Career

SBT
Zakeer joined State Bank of Travancore (SBT) team in 2007.  He proved himself to be a good playmaker with vision on the field.

Viva Kerala
Viva Kerala acquired Mundampara as a  midfielder from SBT in 2009, when they gained promotion to the I-league. He was the backbone of the team, helping them to avoid relegation.

Churchill Brothers
Zakeer accepted a contract offer from Churchill Brothers SC in 2010. He scored his first career goal against Chirag United on 10 April 2011 helping the team secure a win.

Prayag United
On 31 May 2012, it was announced that Mundampara signed with Prayag United of the I-League.

Mohun Bagan
On 6 August 2013 ,it was announced that Zakeer has signed for Mohun Bagan on a one-year deal. 
He made his debut for Mohun Bagan in the I-League on 22 September 2013 against Bengaluru FC at the Bangalore Football Stadium in which he played the whole match and earned a yellow card in the 83rd minute as Mohun Bagan drew the match 1-1.

Chennaiyin FC
In July 2015, Mundampara was drafted to play for Chennaiyin FC in the 2015 Indian Super League.

International
Zakeer made his India U-23 debut on 19 June 2011 against Qatar U23 coming on as a 72nd-minute substitute for Shilton D'Silva.

Honors
Chennaiyin
 Indian Super League: 2015

References

External links
 Zakeer Mundampara at McDowell's Mohun Bagan Athletic Club

1990 births
Living people
I-League players
Indian footballers
Footballers from Kerala
Churchill Brothers FC Goa players
United SC players
Mohun Bagan AC players
Chennaiyin FC players
People from Malappuram
Association football midfielders
Indian Super League players
Kerala Blasters FC players